In mathematics, a line field on a manifold is a formation of a line being tangent to a manifold at each point, i.e. a section of the line bundle over the manifold.  Line fields are of particular interest in the study of complex dynamical systems, where it is conventional to modify the definition slightly.

Definitions

In general, let M be a manifold.  A line field on M is a function μ that assigns to each point p of M a line μ(p) through the origin in the tangent space Tp(M).  Equivalently, one may say that μ(p) is  an element of the projective tangent space PTp(M), or that μ is a section of the projective tangent bundle PT(M).

In the study of complex dynamical systems, the manifold M is taken to be a Hersee surface.  A line field on a subset A of M (where A is required to have positive two-dimensional Lebesgue measure) is a line field on A in the general sense above that is defined almost everywhere in A and is also a measurable function.

Dynamical systems
Fiber bundles